Sogno is an album by Andrea Bocelli.

Sogno may also refer to:
 :it:Sogno (rivista)

People
 Edgardo Sogno

Music
Sogno :it:Sogno (Andrea Mingardi) album by Andrea Mingardi  1993
Il Sogno, album by Elvis Costello 
"Sogno", song by Don Backy, covered by Rudy Rickson, 1968
"Io Sogno", by	Iva Zanicchi, 1969
:it:Sogno/Mamma mammana song by Mietta 1988
"Sogno" :it:Sogno (Gianna Nannini) song by Gianna Nannini  2009